Simon Burgh (died c. 1395), of Wimpole, Cambridgeshire, was an English politician.

He was a Member (MP) of the Parliament of England for Cambridgeshire in 1381, May 1382, January 1390, November 1390 and 1391.

References

Year of birth missing
1390s deaths
14th-century English politicians
English MPs 1381
English MPs May 1382
English MPs January 1390
English MPs November 1390
English MPs 1391
People from Wimpole